Cape Town City F.C. might refer to:

 Cape Town City F.C. (NFL)
 Cape Town City F.C. (2016)